Master is a Russian thrash metal band founded in 1987 by former members of Aria.

History 
In 1987, Alik Granovsky, Andrey Bolshakov, Kirill Pokrovsky, and Igor Molchanov left the heavy metal band Aria, due to their conflict with the producer Victor Vekshtein. Vocalist Mikhail Seryshev and guitarist Sergey Popov joined them to play live concerts. Their first self-titled release was half-completed by Aria's songs written by Granovsky and Bolshakov, but the rest of the songs were completely different in style. Master turned away from Aria's NWOBHM-like style to speed/thrash metal. The second album showcased this change, featuring hard aggressive riffs and fast tempos.

In 1991, Seryshev assumed the role of Jesus in the Russian version of the rock opera Jesus Christ Superstar by Andrew Lloyd Webber. The next year, Master toured Russia with Sepultura.

The next two albums with English lyrics continued in a traditional thrash metal style. In 1993, Andrey Bolshakov left the band. The following album Songs of the Dead turned out to have a more modern, groove metal sound, and the band returned to Russian as the language of their lyrics. Since then, Master has gone away from the thrash metal of their earlier works, and their new albums bear more heavy/power spirit.

In 1997, Seryshev dismissed the French tour. Master toured with Arthur Berkut on vocals, but after the tour Popov, Tony Shender (drums) and he left Master and started a new band called Zooom. Because of his opera career and singing in a church choir, Seryshev was unable to work with Master and left the band; soon after Lexx (Alexey Kravchenko) took his place on vocals. Also, Alexey Strike, a famous Russian guitarist, joined the band. Alexander Karpuhin took over the drums.

In 2004, Alik Granovsky released a solo album, Bolshaya progulka. In 2004, Lexx participated in the metal opera Elven Manuscript by Epidemia.

In January 2008, Alexey Strike and Alexander Karpuhin left the band. Leonid Fomin, Andrey Smirnov, and Oleg Khovrin became the band's new members. The studio album VIII was released in 2010.

In 2011, Andrey Smirnov and Oleg Khovrin left the band. Alexander "Gips" took over the drums and Leo Fomin remained the only guitarist. Smirnov later played in the band Everlost, before joining former Accept singer Udo Dirkschneider's band U.D.O. in 2013.

Discography

Albums 
Мастер (Master) — 1987
С Петлёй На шее (S Petlyoy Na Sheye) (S Petlyoy Na Sheye — With a Lee on the Neck) — 1989
Talk of the Devil — 1992
Maniac Party — 1994
Песни Мёртвых (Pesni Myortvih) (Pesni Myortvih – Songs of The Dead) — 1996
Лабиринт (Labyrinth) (Labirint – Labyrinth) — 2000
33 Жизни (33 Zhizni – 33 lives) — 2004
По Ту Сторону Сна (Po Tu Storonu Sna — The Other Side Of a Dream) — 2005
VIII — 2010
Мастер времени (The Master of Time) — 2020

Other releases 
Live —1995
The Best. Kontsert V Moskve '97 (The Best. Concert in Moscow '97) (also released as Live 97) — 1997
Klassika 1987–2002 (Classics of 1987–2002) — 2001
Tribute to Harley-Davidson — 2001
Akustika (Acoustics) — 2005
XX let (XX years) — 2008

Timeline

References

External links 
 Official website
 Мастер на Encyclopaedia Metallum

Musical groups from Moscow
Russian thrash metal musical groups
Musical groups established in 1987
Soviet heavy metal musical groups